Paddy Anglim (6 September 1904 – 3 March 1954) was an Irish athlete. He competed in the men's long jump at the 1928 Summer Olympics.

References

External links
 

1904 births
1954 deaths
Athletes (track and field) at the 1928 Summer Olympics
Irish male long jumpers
Olympic athletes of Ireland
Place of birth missing